Professor N. Ramanathan (born 1946) is a musicologist in India. He taught and guided research in the Department of Indian Music at the University of Madras since 1978, and retired in 2004.

Biography
He obtained a bachelor's degree in Violin (South Indian Art Music) from Sri Venkateswara University, Tirupati, and obtained his master's and Ph.D. degree in musicology at the Banaras Hindu University, Varanasi.

He has produced many publications and has presented papers at seminars on the Sangita Ratnakara and the Brhaddesi.

Major publications

 Musical Forms in the Sangita Ratnakara. Sampradaya, Chennai, 1999
 Vadi, Samvadi, Anuvadi, and Vivadi Svaras. Journal of the Music Academy, Madras, 1983
 Influence of Sastra on Prayoga: The Svara System in the Post-Sangitaratnakara Period with special reference to south Indian music. The Traditional Indian theory and practice of music and dance By Jonathan Katz.

References

External links
Dr.N.Ramanathan's website musicology research website

1946 births
Ethnomusicologists
Indian musicologists
Living people
Sri Venkateswara University alumni
Recipients of the Sangeet Natak Akademi Award